Hüzeyfe Doğan (born 1 January 1981) is a former professional footballer who played as an attacking midfielder. Born in Turkey and raised in Germany, he represented the Turkey U19 and then the Germany U20s internationally.

Club career
Doğan was born in Karakoçan, Turkey. He moved to Germany at young age and as naturalized German citizen. He started his career with Bonner SC before joined Bayer Leverkusen's youth system. He stayed for six years, and like many Turks in Germany, he tried his chances by joining a Turkish team. He joined Ankaragücü in summer 2003, but returned to Germany for SC Paderborn 07 in summer 2005.

International career
He played for Germany, the country where he was raised, at 2001 FIFA World Youth Championship.

References

External links
 

1981 births
Living people
People from Karakoçan
German footballers
Germany youth international footballers
Turkish footballers
Turkey youth international footballers
German people of Turkish descent
Turkish emigrants to Germany
Association football midfielders
Bonner SC players
Bayer 04 Leverkusen players
Bayer 04 Leverkusen II players
SC Paderborn 07 players
MKE Ankaragücü footballers
Wuppertaler SV players
1. FC Union Berlin players
SC Preußen Münster players
Denizlispor footballers
Yeni Malatyaspor footballers
2. Bundesliga players
3. Liga players
Süper Lig players